The Kei flying fox (Pteropus keyensis) is a species of megabat in the genus Pteropus found in the Kai Islands of Indonesia. It was formerly considered a subspecies of the black-bearded flying fox (Pteropus melanopogon). Very little is known about the species, its habitat, or threats to it.

References

Pteropus
Mammals described in 1867
Taxa named by Wilhelm Peters
Bats of Indonesia